Mesić may refer to:

People
 Mesić (surname)

Places
 Mesić (Vršac), a village in Banat, Vojvodina, Serbia
 Mesić Monastery, a monastery in Banat, Vojvodina, Serbia

See also
 Mesic (disambiguation)